Eric Alfred R Cleaver (born 1927), is a male former athlete who competed for England.

Athletics career
He represented England in the discus at the 1958 British Empire and Commonwealth Games in Cardiff, Wales.

He also competed in the 1962 European Athletics Championships and served in the Royal Army Physical Training Corps.

References

1927 births
English male discus throwers
Athletes (track and field) at the 1958 British Empire and Commonwealth Games
Living people
Commonwealth Games competitors for England
Royal Army Physical Training Corps soldiers
20th-century British Army personnel